Nea Aretsou is a district of Kalamaria, Thessaloniki, Greece. It was created in the 1920s and populated by Greek refugees from the town of Aretsou (modern Darıca) in Turkey.

Populated places in Thessaloniki (regional unit)
Marinas in Greece